National Crusade Party (PCN), formerly National Crusade Movement (MCN), is a populist centre-right political party in Paraguay led by scandalous lawyer and ex-senator Paraguayo "Payo" Cubas.

Party leader Payo Cubas is a prominent political and media personality known for his provocative publicity stunts. A lawyer, he served one term in Congress from 1993 to 1998 as a member of the center-left National Encounter Party. In 2018, Cubas was elected to the Senate as a sole member of the National Crusade Movement but was suspended for outbursts and physical altercations with Senate colleagues.

History 
Following the results of the 2018 elections, the party elected its representative, Payo Cubas, to the Senate. In November 2019, he was expelled from the Senate on charges of abuse of power and hooliganism.

In February 2020, the National Crusade Movement was renamed into a National Crusade Party.

In 2020, the party suffered a split after some members of the MCN accused the leader of the party, Cubas, and his wife, Yolanda Paredes, of authoritarianism.

After the party's failure in the 2021 municipal elections, Paraguayo Cubas, the president of the party, announced his resignation.

On the eve of the 2023 general election, the Cubas party participated in the creation of the Concertación coalition, but soon left it before the election of a single opposition candidate, deciding to participate in the elections independently. In the 2023 elections, party leader Paraguayo Cubas is considered an outsider or spoiler candidate for the Concertación. However, he gains support among the anti-systemic electorate, advocating the death penalty for corruption.

References 

Political parties established in 2018
Political parties in Paraguay
2018 establishments in Paraguay